The 1999 Eastbourne Borough Council election took place on 6 May 1999 to elect members of Eastbourne Borough Council in East Sussex, England. One third of the council was up for election and the Liberal Democrats lost overall control of the council to no overall control.

After the election, the composition of the council was:
Liberal Democrats 15
Conservative 15

Election result
The Conservative party gained two seats from the Liberal Democrats to move the two parties level on 15 seats each. This was the first time the Liberal Democrats had not had a majority in eight years, but they retained control through the mayor's casting vote. Overall turnout at the election was 32.36%, slightly up on the 31.77% at the 1998 election.

Ward results

References

1999
1999 English local elections
1990s in East Sussex